Enrique Varela Vidaurre (1856 – February 4, 1914) was a Peruvian soldier and politician. He was born in Lima, Peru. A veteran of the War of the Pacific, he fought at the Battle of San Francisco and the Battle of Tarapaca. He was wounded in action and taken captive as a prisoner of war in Chile. After his release in 1884, he supported Andrés Avelino Cáceres against Miguel Iglesias in an internal conflict that had broken out following Peru's defeat. He was made a colonel in 1903 and brigadier general in 1910. He commanded Peruvian forces during a border dispute with Ecuador. He was twice Prime Minister of Peru (December 1912 – February 1913, July 1913 – February 1914). He was simultaneously minister of war and navy in the Government of Peru. His cabinet included future prime minister Francisco Tudela y Varela as foreign minister. He was assassinated during a coup by Óscar Benavides against the presidency of Guillermo Billinghurst.

References
 Basadre Grohmann, Jorge: Historia de la República del Perú. 1822 - 1933, Octava Edición, corregida y aumentada. Tomos 10 y 11. Editada por el Diario "La República" de Lima y la Universidad "Ricardo Palma". Impreso en Santiago de Chile, 1998.
 Guerra, Margarita: Historia General del Perú. La República Aristocrática. Tomo XI. Primera Edición. Editor Carlos Milla Batres. Lima, Perú, 1984. Depósito Legal: B. 22436-84 (XI).

1856 births
1914 deaths
People from Lima
Peruvian soldiers
Prime Ministers of Peru